John O'Connor  (January 1, 1824 – November 3, 1887) was a Canadian politician and cabinet minister.

Born in Boston, Massachusetts, the son of Irish immigrants John and Mary O’Connor, he moved with his family to Essex County, Upper Canada in 1828.

A lawyer by training, he was elected to the 7th Parliament of the Province of Canada in 1863. In 1867, he was elected to the 1st Canadian Parliament representing the riding of Essex. He was re-elected to the 2nd Canadian Parliament but was defeated in the 1874 federal election. In the period of 1872 to 1873, he was President of the Privy Council, Minister of Inland Revenue, and Postmaster General.

He was re-elected again in the 1878 federal election for the riding of Russell. From 1878 to 1880, he again was the President of the Privy Council. As well he was the Postmaster General in 1880 and from 1881 to 1882. From 1880 to 1881, he was the Secretary of State of Canada.

In 1884, he was appointed a judge of the Court of Queen’s Bench for Ontario.

References
 
 

1824 births
1887 deaths
American emigrants to pre-Confederation Ontario
Politicians from Boston
Judges in Ontario
Conservative Party of Canada (1867–1942) MPs
Members of the House of Commons of Canada from Ontario
Members of the Legislative Assembly of the Province of Canada from Canada West
Members of the King's Privy Council for Canada
Canadian people of Irish descent
People from Essex County, Ontario
Immigrants to Upper Canada